Blichfeldt is a Scandinavian surname. Notable people with this name include:
Alberte Blichfeldt, Danish actress in The Woman That Dreamed About a Man (2010) and The Great Bear (2011)
Anders Blichfeldt, Danish pop/rock musician in Big Fat Snake
Bror Blichfeldt, Norwegian footballer, scored in Football at the 1997 Island Games
Ebbe Blichfeldt, Danish wheelchair racer
Emil Blichfeldt (1849–1908), Danish architect
Hans Frederick Blichfeldt (1873–1945), Danish-American mathematician
Jon Frode Blichfeldt (born 1944), Norwegian psychologist
, Norwegian textbook author, winner of 2006 Brage Prize
Mia Blichfeldt (born 1997), Danish badminton player